Nykoluk is a Ukrainian surname. Notable people with the surname include:

Danny Nykoluk (1933–2016), Canadian football player
Mike Nykoluk (born 1934), Canadian ice hockey player

See also
 

Ukrainian-language surnames